The Medal of the Oriental Republic of Uruguay is a distinction of Uruguay created by Law No. 16300 and awarded by the Presidency of the Republic at the initiative of the Ministry of Foreign Affairs to foreign personalities, by reason of the principle of protocol reciprocity.

The Law by which it was created, on August 28, 1992, establishes that the Executive Power is authorized to mint the medal, with the objective that the Presidency, at the initiative of the Ministry of Foreign Affairs, deliver it to foreign personalities with reasons reciprocity, previously reporting to the General Assembly, and entrusts the Executive Power with the regulation of the registration, design, ceremony and other matters of the medal. The regulation of the law was given by Decree No. 132/993 of March 16, 1993, which approves the Regulation of the Medal.

Characteristics 
The distinction consists of the medal and the diploma. The medal is characterized by having on its forehead the National Coat of Arms, made of 24-karat gold-plated metal with dimensions of 65 millimeters high by 60 millimeters wide. Its Sun is carved, the laurel and olive leaves accompany the oval of the Coat of Arms in half a carved point, and its center have a "bulge", with white and blue enameled colors with a glass finish. The reverse of it contains the text "Oriental Republic of Uruguay" in relief and with a diameter of 41 millimeters, and in the center the text "Medal of the Republic" in relief, straight in three lines.

To reward the Medal there is a public act directed by the President of the Republic, who reward the Medal along with a Diploma signed by himself. If award is not possible because the beneficiary is abroad, it can be done by a person designated by the Executive Power.

Recipients

References

External links 

  Foreign Relations Ministry of Uruguay
  National Institute of Prints and Official Publications

Civil awards and decorations of Uruguay
Awards established in 1992
1992 establishments in Uruguay